Alexander Evgenievich Vakhnov (born 16 February 1999) is a Russian competitive ice dancer. With his former skating partner, Sofia Polishchuk, he is the 2017 Junior Grand Prix Final bronze medalist and 2017 JGP Australia champion.

Personal life 
Alexander Evgenievich Vakhnov was born on 16 February 1999 in Kirov, Kirov Oblast, Russia.

Career

Early career 
Vakhnov began learning to skate in 2003. He teamed up with Sofia Polishchuk ahead of the 2009–2010 season.

Polishchuk/Vakhnov started competing internationally in the 2010–2011 season, winning the basic novice category at the 2010 NRW Trophy. They made their international junior-level debut during the 2014–2015 season; they won bronze at the 2014 Ice Star and 2014 NRW Trophy.

2015–2016 season 
Polishchuk/Vakhnov received their first ISU Junior Grand Prix (JGP) assignments in the 2015–2016 season. After winning a bronze medal in early September at the JGP in Colorado Springs, United States, they finished fifth three weeks later in Toruń, Poland.

They placed sixth at the 2016 Russian Junior Championships.

2016–2017 season 
Competing in the 2016 JGP series, Polishchuk/Vakhnov won bronze in August in Saint-Gervais-les-Bains, France, and then silver in September in Ljubljana, Slovenia. They placed fourth at the 2017 Russian Junior Championships.

2017–2018 season 
Competing in their ninth season together, Polishchuk/Vakhnov won gold in August at the 2017 JGP event in Brisbane, Australia. They beat the silver medalists, Marjorie Lajoie / Zachary Lagha, by seven points. In October, they won the silver medal at the 2017 JGP event in Egna, Italy. Polishchuk/Vakhnov were beaten by their teammates Arina Ushakova / Maxim Nekrasov by about two points. With these results Polishchuk/Vakhnov qualified for the 2017–18 ISU Junior Grand Prix Final, where they won the bronze medal after placing third in both segments.

In January 2018, Polishchuk/Vakhnov finished fourth at the 2018 Russian Junior Championships after placing fourth in both segments. They were coached by Svetlana Liapina in Moscow. Their partnership ended by spring 2018.

2018–2019 season 
Vakhnov teamed up with Ksenia Konkina in spring 2018. Coached by Liapina in Moscow, the two won bronze in their international debut, at the 2018 JGP event in Vancouver, Canada. They did not receive a second JGP assignment and therefore could not qualify for the 2018–19 Junior Grand Prix Final. Their partnership ended by November 2018.

2019–2020 season 
Vakhnov teamed up with Svetlana Lizunova prior to the season. They placed eighth at 2019 JGP Croatia.

2020-2021 season 

Lizunova/Vakhnov placed seventh at the 2021 Russian Nationals.

2021-2022 

They did not compete this season, and in January, Vakhnov was seen on Ice Partner Search, indicating the two had split. Liuznova later announced her retirement.

2022-2023 season 

In May, it was announced that Vakhnov had teamed up with American Isabella Flores, presumably for the United States.

Programs

With Lizunova

With Konkina

With Polishchuk

Competitive highlights 
JGP: Junior Grand Prix

With Lizunova

With Konkina

With Polishchuk

Detailed results

With Lizunova

With Konkina

With Polishchuk

References

External links 
 
 
 
 

1999 births
Russian male ice dancers
Living people
Sportspeople from Kirov, Kirov Oblast